"Walkin' Down the Line" is a song written by Bob Dylan and first recorded by him in November 1962 for Broadside magazine. Dylan recorded the song again in March 1963 for his music publisher Witmark and this version was released in 1991 on The Bootleg Series Volumes 1–3 (Rare & Unreleased) 1961–1991.

The lyrics recount the troubles of a hobo walking down the railroad tracks.

It was sung by Arlo Guthrie at Woodstock and his performance appears on the 1994 Woodstock 25th anniversary box set.

Covers
1963 - Jackie DeShannon on her debut album, Jackie DeShannon
1964 - Hamilton Camp on his album Paths of Victory
1964 - Glen Campbell on his album The Astounding 12-String Guitar of Glen Campbell
1964 - The Dillards on their album Live!!!! Almost!!!<ref>[http://www.allmusic.com/album/live-almost-r938372 Allmusic track listing for Live!!!! Almost!!!] Retrieved March 11, 2012</ref>
1964 - The Goldebriars on their album Straight Ahead!
1965 - Joe & Eddie on their album Walkin' Down the Line
1965 - The Gene Norman Group on its album Dylan Jazz
1965 - Odetta on her album Odetta Sings Dylan
1967 - Ricky Nelson on his album Country Fever
1968 - Joan Baez on her album of Dylan covers Any Day Now
1969 - Glenn Yarbrough on his album Yarbrough Country
1971 - Oliver on his album Prism
1972 - Guy Carawan on his album The Telling Takes Me Home
1972 - The Country Gentlemen on their album The Award Winning Country Gentlemen
1975 - Arlo Guthrie and Pete Seeger on the album Together in Concert
1979 - Guy Carawan, Hannes Wader, Werner Lämmerhirt e.a. on Folk Friends
1992 - Rising Sons on their album Rising Sons Featuring Taj Mahal and Ry Cooder (recorded in the mid-1960s)
1997 - Rick Robbins on his album Walkin' Down The Line
2003 - Sean Hayes on his album Alabama Chicken
2004 - The Flatlanders on their album Live '72 (recorded in 1972)
2007 - Eilen Jewell on Letters From Sinners & Strangers
2011 - Robin and Linda Williams on the Dylan tribute album A Nod to Bob 2

References

1963 songs
Songs written by Bob Dylan
Bob Dylan songs
Jackie DeShannon songs
Ricky Nelson songs
Oliver (singer) songs
Glen Campbell songs